Psilocybe natarajanii is a species of mushroom in the family Hymenogastraceae. The mushroom contains the medicinal compound psilocybin.

It was described from the state of Tamil Nadu in India.

See also
List of Psilocybin mushrooms
Psilocybin mushrooms
Psilocybe

References

Entheogens
Psychoactive fungi
natarajanii
Psychedelic tryptamine carriers
Fungi of North America